Duan railway station, in the Indian state of West Bengal, serves Duan, India in Paschim Medinipur district. It is on the Howrah–Kharagpur line. Its trains run  from Howrah station.

History
Duan railway station is situated in National Highway 6, Debra, West Bengal. Its station code is DUAN. It is a small railway station between Howrah and Kharagpur, and the local EMU services Howrah–Balichak, Howrah–Kharagpur, Santragachi–Kharagpur local, and Howrah–Kharagpur stop there. The Howrah–Kharagpur line was opened in 1900. The Howrah–Kharagpur stretch has three lines. There is a plan to build a fourth line for the Santragachi–Panskura–Kharagpur stretch.
The Howrah–Kharagpur line was electrified in 1967–69.

References

External links
Trains at Duan

Railway stations in Paschim Medinipur district
Kolkata Suburban Railway stations